Hong Kong Gold Coast Hotel is a five-star hotel and conference centre at 1 Castle Peak Road, So Kwun Wat, Tuen Mun District, New Territories, Hong Kong. The hotel is a part of Hong Kong Gold Coast, which was developed by Sino Group and completed in 1993, offering a total of 453 guest rooms. Besides the hotel, the area includes a yacht club, country club, marina, shopping mall and residential buildings.

References

External links

Official website of Hong Kong Gold Coast Hotel

So Kwun Wat
Sino Group
Hotels in Hong Kong
Convention and exhibition centres in Hong Kong
Residential buildings completed in 1993
Hotels established in 1993
1993 establishments in Hong Kong